Bregje Heinen (born 5 March 1993) is a Dutch fashion model.

Career
Heinen was discovered in Hyves by a scout for Salva Models. Shortly afterwards, she switched to Micha Models. She has since joined Women Management in Milan, Paris and New York, Select London, Dominique Brussels, UNO Barcelona, and Place Hamburg.

She modeled for Guess, DKNY, Prada, Just Cavalli, Topshop, Karen Millen, Sisley, H&M and Versace. Heinen walked the runway for Alexander McQueen, Donna Karan, Just Cavalli, Elie Saab, Zac Posen, Fendi, Balenciaga, Stella McCartney, and Karl Lagerfeld. She has appeared in editorials for Italian, Russian, Netherlands and  Spain Elle, U.S, Japanese, Mexican and Kazakhstan Harper's Bazaar and British, Portugal, Russian and Mexican Vogue. She also appeared on Maroon 5's music video for "Payphone".

Victoria's Secret
In 2011, Heinen walked in the Victoria's Secret Fashion Show.  Alongside Candice Swanepoel and Lais Ribeiro, Heinen then appeared in the commercial for the brand's underwear collection, Body by Victoria. She made her second appearance in the company's fashion show in 2012. In 2013, she was in the Victoria's Secret "multi way" bra commercial and walked in 2014 fashion show.

Personal life

Heinen was born in Borculo, a town in the eastern Netherlands. She has been living in New York since she was seventeen. Since 2021, Heinen has been dating American actor Micheal Trevino, known for his roles as Tyler Lockwood on The CW's The Vampire Diaries; and as Kyle Valenti in Roswell, New Mexico.

Filmography

Music videos

References

External links
 

1993 births
Living people
Dutch female models
People from Berkelland
Elite Model Management models
Women Management models